Hindu-tagh Pass, also known as Hindutash, is a historical mountain pass in the western Xinjiang, China. The pass cuts through the Kunlun Mountains connecting the now-deserted town of Kangxiwar in the Karakash River valley to the town of Pusha in the Pusha Jilga valley (formerly Bushia). It also connects to the road to the city of Hotan (formerly Khotan or Ilchi; see maps on right).

 is under construction connecting Kangxiwar directly with Hotan. It will tunnel under Hindutash, connect with the Xinjiang-Tibet Highway G219 to the south after numerous hairpin turns. It is scheduled to be completed in 2022.

"Hindu-tagh" means "Indian Mountain," and "Hindu-tash," "Indian stone" in the Uyghur dialect of Xinjiang.

History
At the top of the pass, there is a steep glacier with many crevasses. The eastern Kunlun range, which is in the southern region of the Hotan prefecture of Xinjiang, is cut by two other passes: the Sanju Pass, near the small staging post of Xaidulla, formerly Shahidulla, northwest of Hindu-tagh, and  the Ilchi Pass, southeast of Hindu-tagh, just north-east of the village of Dahongliutan,  itself just north of the now disputed Aksai Chin area (see second map on right). The former pass had been much used historically, and provided the traditional means of entry from the south into the ancient Kingdom of Khotan. The latter was traversed in 1865 by W. H. Johnson of the Survey of India.

Gallery

Maps

See also
Xinjiang
Aksai Chin
Kunlun Mountains
Yurungkash
Karakash River

Notes

References
.
.
.
.
.

Kunlun Mountains
Mountain passes of Xinjiang
Mountain passes of China